The Palmer Baronetcy, of Castle Lackin in the County of Mayo, was created in the Baronetage of Ireland on 29 May 1777 for Roger Palmer. The fifth Baronet sat as Member of Parliament for County Mayo. The title became extinct on his death in 1910.

Palmer baronets of Castle Lackin (1777)
Sir Roger Palmer, 1st Baronet (died )
Sir John Roger Palmer, 2nd Baronet (died 1819)
Sir William Henry Palmer, 3rd Baronet (died 1840)
Sir William Henry Roger Palmer, 4th Baronet (1802–1869)
Sir Roger William Henry Palmer, 5th Baronet (1832–1910). He died without heir, and the baronetcy was then extinct.

See also
 Palmer baronets

Notes

Extinct baronetcies in the Baronetage of Ireland
1777 establishments in Ireland
1910 disestablishments in the United Kingdom